Stephen Boyd Peat (born March 10, 1980) is a Canadian former professional ice hockey winger who played as an enforcer.  He was drafted in the second round, 32nd overall, by the Mighty Ducks of Anaheim in the 1998 NHL Entry Draft.  Anaheim traded his rights to the Washington Capitals in exchange for a draft pick before the 2000 NHL Entry Draft.

Peat played four seasons in the Western Hockey League before joining the Capitals' American Hockey League affiliate, the Portland Pirates.  Peat debuted in the National Hockey League with the Capitals in the 2001–02 season, scoring four points in 38 games.  In four seasons, Peat appeared in 130 games with the Capitals and recorded 10 points.

On December 28, 2005, the Capitals traded Peat to the Carolina Hurricanes in exchange for Colin Forbes.

On September 2, 2015, Peat pleaded guilty to arson by negligence related to a fire at his father's home occurring on March 17, 2015, following a domestic dispute.  He was originally charged with arson with disregard for human life and arson causing property damage.  Due to witness testimony and involvement, the fire was immediately declared an arson.

Health issues
In November 2017, Peat's father, Walter Peat, sought a no-contact order against his son. In a series of text messages published in the New York Times, Peat's father described him as a violent, homeless, addict who suffers from severe headaches. He believed this is all attributable to brain injuries his son received playing NHL: 
Right now, I am at a loss of what to do, and who to turn to for help. Many night, I lose countless hours of sleep, thinking of what will happen, and am I doing the right thing. There are so many people who prefer to put a paper bag over their head and ignore the fact that Stephen or so many players suffer from these injuries. But, the injuries just don’t stop there, as the emotional, financial, and in some cases, physical injuries suffered by family members.

However, Peat has disputed his father's accounts saying “I am disappointed in my father since I once held him so high on a pedestal.” Walter Peat reiterated his concerns in December 2017, saying that Stephen was living on the street, using drugs and possibly close to death.

Career statistics

References

External links

Stephen Peat's career statistics at Hockey Reference.

1980 births
Albany River Rats players
Calgary Hitmen players
Canadian ice hockey right wingers
Danbury Trashers players
Hershey Bears players
Ice hockey people from British Columbia
Living people
Lowell Lock Monsters players
Anaheim Ducks draft picks
Portland Pirates players
Red Deer Rebels players
Tri-City Americans players
Washington Capitals players
People from Princeton, British Columbia